Puhl is a surname. Notable people with the name include:

Sándor Puhl (1955–2021), Hungarian football referee
Terry Puhl (born 1956), Canadian retired professional baseball outfielder
Cathrin Puhl born 1994), German rhythmic gymnast
John Puhl (1876–1900), American professional baseball player from Brooklyn 
Emil Puhl (1889–1962), Nazi economist and banking official during World War II

It may also refer to:
Puhl & Wagner was the largest German company for the production of glass mosaics and stained glass (Based in Berlin, traded from 1889-1969)